Jon Gruenewald (born February 5, 1987 in New Hartford, New York) is a retired American soccer player, last playing for Syracuse Silver Knights in the MISL.

Career

Youth and College
Gruenewald attended Fayetteville-Manlius High School, where he totaled 42 goals and 57 assists in five seasons. During his senior year he was named Central New York Player of the Year and received 2004 NSCAA/adidas High School Boys All-America honors.

Jon played four seasons at Rollins College, finishing his career with 25 goals and a school-record 42 assists. He was named to the Sunshine State Conference first team, the NSCAA All-South Region second team, and the Daktronics All-South Region first team during his junior season. In his final Rollins season he was named to the Sunshine State Conference All-Tournament team, NSCAA All-South Region first team, Daktronics All-America first team, NSCAA/Performance Subaru All-America first team and NSCAA/adidas Scholar All-America first team as well as being awarded Sunshine State Conference Player of the Year, Offensive Player of the Year and Daktronics South Region Player of the Year.

During his final two seasons at Rollins Gruenewald also played in the USL Premier Development League for the Central Florida Kraze.

Professional
Gruenewald signed his first professional contract with the Charleston Battery in April 2010 after impressing coaches at the 2010 USL PDL Player Showcase, and the 2010 Carolina Challenge Cup. He made his professional debut on June 15, 2010 in a Lamar Hunt U.S. Open Cup game against the CASL Elite., and scored his first professional goal on May 24, 2011 in a 2-1 win over the Richmond Kickers.

Honors

Charleston Battery
USL Second Division Champions (1): 2010
USL Second Division Regular Season Champions (1): 2010

References

External links
 Charleton Battery bio
 Rollins bio

1987 births
Living people
American soccer players
Orlando City U-23 players
Charleston Battery players
Syracuse Silver Knights players
USL League Two players
USL Second Division players
USL Championship players
Association football defenders
Soccer players from New York (state)
People from New Hartford, New York
Rollins Tars men's soccer players
Major Indoor Soccer League (2008–2014) players